Tin Heng may refer to:
 Tin Heng Estate, a public housing estate in Tin Shui Wai, Hong Kong
 Tin Heng stop, an MTR Light Rail stop adjacent to the estate
 Tin Heng (constituency), of the Yuen Long District Council